The Gillespie Street-Clinton River Bridge is a bridge carrying Gillespie Street over the Clinton River in Pontiac, Michigan. It is a relatively early example of a rigid-frame bridge in Michigan. The bridge was listed on the National Register of Historic Places in 2000.

History
This bridge was apparently the first at this location. In 1936, the city of Pontiac deepened the Clinton River and extended Gillespie Street. They contracted with consulting engineer Harold Hawley Corson to design this bridge, who was serving as Birmingham's city engineer after a stint with the Michigan State Highway Department. Corson designed this rigid frame bridge, then a relatively new type of bridge which had been introduced in Michigan in the early 1930s.

Description
The Gillespie Street bridge is a rigid-frame bridge with shallow spandrels ornamented with recessed panels. The bridge is 34 feet long, spanning a 33-foot-wide channel, and 50.5 feet wide. The railings are simple metal panels, ending in chain link fencing. The roadway is 36.5 feet wide, with sidewalks on each side.

References

External links
 Gillespie Street-Clinton River Bridge at Historic Bridges.org

National Register of Historic Places in Oakland County, Michigan
Bridges completed in 1936